The 1932 Brown Bears football team was an American football team that represented Brown University as an independent during the 1932 college football season. Led by seventh-year head coach Tuss McLaughry, the Bears compiled a record of 7–1. The team's only loss was to Colgate, who finished the season undefeated.

Schedule

References

Brown
Brown Bears football seasons
Brown Bears football